Rodrigo Eduardo Cuevas González (born 18 September 1973 in Quintero) is a Chilean former footballer who played as a goalkeeper.

Career
Cuevas played for Chilean clubs Santiago Wanderers (1994–1997 and 2000), Santiago Morning (1998–1999 and 2001–2004) and Unión San Felipe (2005).

At international level, he took part of a Chile national under-23 squad made up by players from the Segunda División.

Following his retirement as a football player, he represented the Chile beach soccer team in both the 2008 and the 2009 South American Championships, alongside retired professional footballers such as Rodrigo Sanhueza, Germán Osorio, Cristian Olivares,  and Carlos Medina, with Miguel Ángel Gamboa as coach. In 2010, he also won the XI Copa Latina.

Honours
Santiago Wanderers
 Segunda División: 1995

Chile (beach soccer)
 Copa Latina: 2010

References

External links
 Rodrigo Cuevas at MemoriaWanderers.cl 

1973 births
Living people
People from Valparaíso Province
Chilean footballers
Chile youth international footballers
Chilean expatriate footballers
Association football goalkeepers
Santiago Wanderers footballers
Santiago Morning footballers
C.D. Arturo Fernández Vial footballers
Mitra Kukar players
Unión San Felipe footballers
Chilean Primera División players
Primera B de Chile players
Chilean expatriate sportspeople in Indonesia
Expatriate footballers in Indonesia